Bonaparte Mujuru (born 10 April 1987) is a Zimbabwean first-class cricketer who plays for Matabeleland Tuskers.

References

External links
 

1987 births
Living people
Zimbabwean cricketers
Matabeleland Tuskers cricketers
Sportspeople from Mashonaland East Province